Johann Friedrich or Joh(an)n Frederick may refer to:
Johann Friedrich (theologian)
Johann Friedrich, Duke of Pomerania
Johann Frederick, Duke of Württemberg
John Frederick I, Elector of Saxony, called Johann Friedrich

See also
Johannes Friedrich (disambiguation)